The Northeast 111 is a peak-bagging list of  mountains in the northeastern states of the United States.  It includes the sixty-seven 4000-footers of New England (48 in New Hampshire, 14 in Maine and 5 in Vermont), the 46 Adirondack High Peaks, and Slide and Hunter Mountain, both in the Catskills of New York.

There are also four peaks in the Adirondacks that are under 4,000 feet, (Blake Peak, Cliff Mountain, Couchsachraga Peak, and Nye Mountain) making the true number of 4,000 foot peaks 111.

See also 
 New England Four-thousand footers
 Adirondack High Peaks
 Catskill Mountain 3500 Club
 Quebec 1000 meter peaks

External links
 Interactive Map of the Northeast 111 Including trails, camping, weather, and driving directions
 Catskill High Peaks including Slide and Hunter Trails

References

 
Peak bagging in the United States